Hamner Nunatak is a nunatak lying west of the Warren Range, Antarctica,  west-northwest of Wise Peak. It was named by the Advisory Committee on Antarctic Names in 1964 for Karl C. Hamner, a biologist at McMurdo Station, 1960–61.

References

Nunataks of Antarctica
Oates Land